Events from the year 1577 in France

Incumbents
 Monarch – Henry III

Events
 
 September 17 – The Treaty of Bergerac is signed between Henry III of France and the Huguenots.

Births
 François Leclerc du Tremblay
 Noël Brûlart de Sillery

Deaths
 Louis III de La Trémoille

See also

References

1570s in France